Flight controller may refer to:

Ground-based staff and positions 
 Air traffic controller, a person trained to expedite and maintain a safe and orderly flow of air traffic
 Flight controller, a person who aids in the operations of a space flight

On-board systems 
 A civil-airliner flight controller, or autopilot
 An UAV flight controller, a combination of hardware and software that helps control the UAV flight

See also
 Aircraft flight control systems, which cover main flight controls
 Comparison table including UAV flight controllers 
 Flight director (disambiguation)
 Joystick, used to control a (real or simulated) aircraft